This is a list of Sri Lankan women's One-day international cricketers. Overall, 72 Sri Lankan women have played in at least one women's one-day international. A One Day International, or an ODI, is an international cricket match between two representative teams, each having ODI status. An ODI differs from test matches in that the number of overs per team is limited, and that each team has only one innings. The list is arranged in the order in which each player won her first ODI cap. Where more than one player won her first ODI cap in the same match, those players are listed alphabetically by surname.

Key

Players
Statistics are correct as on 7 July 2022.

References 

 
Sri Lanka women ODI
Sri Lanka